George Huddesford (1699?1776), D.D., was an English academic administrator and museum keeper at the University of Oxford.

Huddesford was elected President (head) of Trinity College, Oxford in 1731, a post he held until 1776.
During his time as President of Trinity College, he was Keeper of the Ashmolean Museum in Oxford from 1732 to 1755. He was also Vice-Chancellor of Oxford University from 1753 until 1756.

Rev. George Huddesford (1749–1809), a painter and satirical poet based in Oxford, was his son. His younger son, William Huddesford took over from his father as Keeper of the Ashmolean Museum in 1755.

References

1690s births
1776 deaths
Presidents of Trinity College, Oxford
People associated with the Ashmolean Museum
English curators
Vice-Chancellors of the University of Oxford